is a Japanese composer and arranger, best known for composing music for the Tekken and Drakengard series. He started his career at Namco in 1994, where he primarily composed for arcade games. Outside of video games, he has composed for anime series such as Working!! and Yuki Yuna is a Hero, along with arranging tracks for J-pop artists. He established the music production studio Monaca in 2004, which composes for various types of media.

Biography 
Okabe started taking electric organ lessons as a child, covering contemporary pop and film music. Although he did not learn from teachers, he would develop his musical skills through joining a band and recording music. He has cited Henry Mancini, Ennio Morricone, and Ryuichi Sakamoto as being some of his musical influences. After graduating from Kobe Design University, he joined Namco in 1994, with his first work being a handful of tracks for medal game Spiral Fall. He would also work on titles such as Air Combat 22, along with some arrangements for the PS1 version of Tekken 2. This would lead to him scoring Tekken 3 along with fellow Namco composer Nobuyoshi Sano. Both composers chose to make big beat music for the game as it both fitted the atmosphere of the game and had not been done in video games before. He and Sano would also work on Tekken Tag Tournament with other composers in 1999.

He left Namco in 2001 to become a freelancer, as he wanted more freedom to work on non-game projects. This led to him composing and arranging a number of songs for various artists, such as Ryuichi Kawamura. Three years later, he founded music production studio Monaca. Although it originally consisted of just Okabe, he would later be joined by ex-Namco composers such as Satoru Kōsaki, who also wanted to work on non-game projects. To this day, the studio frequently compose for both video games and anime, as well as other types of media such as live action films.

In 2010, he served as the lead composer for Nier, being assisted by fellow Monaca composers Kakeru Ishihama and Keigo Hoashi, along with Cavia composer Takafumi Nishimura. To fit with the game's story, he composed a soundtrack that he describes as "mysterious, delicate, and ephemeral". The team were given creative freedom, while working under Yoko Taro's direction, who attended the same university as Okabe and was a 3D graphics designer at Namco. The composers worked with English-Japanese singer Emi Evans, who wrote and sung the lyrics present in the game's songs.

Okabe, Ishihama and Hoashi would go on to compose for its 2017 sequel Nier: Automata, while being joined by Kuniyuki Takahashi. Its music was acclaimed; it won the award for "Best Score/Music" at The Game Awards 2017, and was a runner-up for "Best Original Music" at IGN's Best of 2017 Awards.

In 2019, he composed for battle royale game Cyber Hunter with fellow Monaca composer Ryuichi Takada, both working with violinist Yu Manabe.

Works

Video games

Anime

Other

References

External links 
 Profile at Monaca 
 Discography at VGMdb
 

1969 births
21st-century Japanese male singers
21st-century Japanese singers
Anime composers
Japanese male composers
Japanese music arrangers
Japanese techno musicians
Japanese television composers
Living people
Male television composers
Musicians from Hyōgo Prefecture
Japanese sound designers
Video game composers